The 1884 international cricket season was from April 1884 to September 1884. The season consisted of a single international tour, visiting with Australia  England for The Ashes series.

Season overview

July

Australia in England

References

International cricket competitions by season
1884 in cricket